

Heraclea Pontica, known in Byzantine and later times as Pontoheraclea, was an ancient city on the coast of Bithynia in Asia Minor, at the mouth of the river Lycus. It was founded by the Greek city-state of Megara in approximately 560–558 BC and was named after Heracles who the Greeks believed entered the underworld at a cave on the adjoining Archerusian promontory (Cape Baba). The site is now the location of the modern city Karadeniz Ereğli, in the Zonguldak Province of Turkey.

The colonists soon subjugated the native Mariandynians but agreed to terms that none of the latter, now helot-like serfs, be sold into slavery outside their homeland. Prospering from the rich, fertile adjacent lands and the sea-fisheries of its natural harbor, Heraclea soon extended its control along the coast as far east as Cytorus (Gideros, near Cide), eventually establishing Black Sea colonies of its own (Cytorus, Callatis and Chersonesus). It was the birthplace of the philosopher Heraclides Ponticus.

The prosperity of the city, rudely shaken by the Galatians and the Bithynians, was utterly destroyed in the Mithridatic Wars.

The Greek historical author Memnon of Heraclea (fl. 1st century AD) wrote a local history of Heraclea Pontica in at least sixteen books. The work has perished, but Photius's Bibliotheca preserves a compressed account of books 9–16, seemingly the only ones extant in his day. These books run from the rule of the tyrant Clearchus (c. 364–353 BC) to the later years of Julius Caesar (c. 40 BC) and contain many colorful accounts including the Bithynian introduction of the barbarian Gauls into Asia where they first allied themselves with the Heracleans and later turned violently against them.

Then, Heraclea Pontica was part of the (Eastern) Roman Empire for more than 1000 years. The Turks ravaged the area after the Battle of Mantzikert in 1071. David Komnenos, brother of the ruler of Trebizond Alexios I of Trebizond, took Heraclea Pontica in 1205 and made it capital of his domain, called Paphlagonia; he lost it in 1214 to Theodore I Laskaris, who made it a major frontier bulwark. The Genoese had a colony there after 1261. When the Turks conquered Paphlagonia in 1360, Genoa bought the city from the weakening Byzantine Empire. Heraclea developed as a trading centre of the Genoese, who settled there in large numbers. A ruined citadel on a height overlooking the town is a remnant of this period. The Italian name of the city was Pontarachia. The Genoese held the city until the Ottomans captured it after 1453.

Notable people
 Herodorus, mythographer, born in Heraclea.
 Heraclides Ponticus, philosopher and astronomer, born in Heraclea
 Xenagoras (historian), historian
 Memnon of Heraclea, historian
 Bryson of Heraclea, mathematician and sophist
 Clearchus of Heraclea, tyrant of Heraclea
 Timotheus of Heraclea, son of Clearchus and succeeded him after his death
 Chion of Heraclea, a disciple of Plato who helped in the assassination of the tyrant Clearchus
 Oxyathres of Heraclea, tyrant of Heraclea
 Chamaeleon, philosopher
 Promathidas of Heraclea, historian
 Marcian of Heraclea, geographer
 Nicetas of Heraclea, Metropolitan of Heraclea
 Dionysius of Heraclea, tyrant of Heraclea
 Amastris, tyrant of Heraclea, niece to Persian King Darius III
 Diogenianus, a Greek grammarian

See also 
 List of ancient Greek cities

Notes

References

"Outpost of Hellenism: The Emergence of Heraclea on the Black Sea", Stanley Mayer Burstein, University of California Publications:  Classical Studies, 14 (Berkeley, 1976).

External links
 Coin minted in Heraclea Pontica 3rd–2nd century BC.
 Photius's Bibliotheca 224, Memnon of Heraclea, History of Heraclea

 
History of Karadeniz Ereğli
Greek colonies in Bithynia
Populated places in Bithynia
Megarian colonies
Populated places established in the 6th century BC
Members of the Delian League
Populated places of the Byzantine Empire